Kanysh-Kyya is a village in the Chatkal river valley of Jalal-Abad Region, Kyrgyzstan. Its population was 4,805 in 2021. It is the administrative seat of Chatkal District.

References
 

Populated places in Jalal-Abad Region